The Glock knife is a military field knife product line designed and produced by Glock Ges.m.b.H., located in Deutsch-Wagram, Austria. It can also be used as a bayonet, by engaging a socket in the pommel (covered by a plastic cap) into a bayonet adapter that can be fitted to the Steyr AUG rifle.

Design
The knives were developed in close cooperation with the special forces Jagdkommando (lit. Hunting Command) of the Austrian Army and are suitable for throwing.

Both knives have clip point blades made of SAE 1095 carbon steel with a hardness of 55 HRC and are electrophoretic coated. 

The grips and sheaths of both knives are made of Glock polymer. The grip material has a lower hardness than the polymer used in Glock pistols, avoiding possible problems due to brittleness, but it is also less scratch-resistant. The handle of the Glock field knives was originally available in the colours olive drab, black, gray and desert sand, and currently (2021) in olive drab (international name "battle field green"), black, gray and brown (international name "flat dark earth"). The upper crossguard is bent forward to allow the knife to be used as a bayonet on the Steyr AUG rifle. It can be used as a bottle opener.

First generation versions of the knives had a circular Glock logo on the sheath, blade, and handle. Later versions have the current Glock logo in the same locations, with "Made in Austria" etched on the blade above the logo.

Variants
Glock currently manufactures two models of knife: 

The Survival Knife 81 (Feldmesser 81) has the same overall dimensions as the Field Knife 78 with the addition of saw-teeth on the back of the blade and weighs .

Commemorative Versions

 The Field Knife 78 40th Anniversary knife was released to commemorate the 40th anniversary of Glock. It has an olive drab handle and sheath and laser-etched blade, came in a silver Glock pistol case and was released in 2018. 780 of the knives were produced, each of which is numbered. A certificate of authenticity was also included.
 The Field Knife 78 GSSF 25th Anniversary was released in 2016 to commemorate the 25th year of the Glock Sport Shooting Foundation (GSSF). The blade is laser etched with the GSSF logo and reference to the 25th anniversary.

Users

: Austrian Armed Forces
 Field knife 78 issued with the designation of FM 78 or FMsr 78
: Royal Danish Army
 Field knife 78 issued with the designation of Feltkniv M/96, NSN 1095-22-262-1779
: GSG9 of the German Federal Police
 Field knife 78 issued with the designation of  FM 78
:
 Special forces of India 
 National Security Guard (NSG)
 Special Protection Group (SPG)
: Palace guards
: Pasukan Gerakan Khas of the Royal Malaysia Police
 Survival knife 81 issued with the designation of  FM 81
 69 Commando insignia carved at sheath and its blade
: Military Gendarmerie
 Field knife 78 and 81
: Republic of China Armed Forces (ROCAF)
 Field knife 78 and 81
: 707th Special Mission Battalion
 Field knife 78

See also
Glock pistol
Glock entrenching tool

References

Military knives
Bayonets
Military equipment introduced in the 1970s